Nymboida is a village in New South Wales, Australia.

It may also refer to other subjects in the area:

Nymboida National Park
Nymboida River
Nymboida Power Station
Nymboida Shire; a now defunct local government area.